Godwin Richard Olofua (born 18 April 1999) is a Nigerian badminton player who participated at local and international badminton competitions representing Nigeria and has won several trophies. Olofua won gold medal in the mixed team event with silver and bronze medals in singles and doubles events at the 2019 African Championships in Port Harcourt, Nigeria. He also won gold during the 2019 African Games in the mixed team, a silver in the men's doubles and a bronze in the men's singles. Olofua won the men's doubles title at the 2018 Côte d'Ivoire, 2019 Benin and Cameroon International tournaments partnered with Anuoluwapo Juwon Opeyori. He competed at the 2020 Summer Olympics.

Achievements

African Games 
Men's singles

 
Men's doubles

African Championships 
Men's singles

 
Men's doubles

BWF International Challenge/Series (4 titles, 6 runners-up) 
Men's doubles

  BWF International Challenge tournament
  BWF International Series tournament
  BWF Future Series tournament

References

External links 

 

1999 births
Living people
Nigerian male badminton players
Badminton players at the 2020 Summer Olympics
Olympic badminton players of Nigeria
Competitors at the 2019 African Games
African Games gold medalists for Nigeria
African Games silver medalists for Nigeria
African Games bronze medalists for Nigeria
African Games medalists in badminton
21st-century Nigerian people